The paradoxical grass moth (Heliocheilus paradoxus) is a species of moth of the family Noctuidae.  It is found from Ontario and British Columbia, south to at least California, Arizona, Texas and Florida.

The wingspan is 24–26 mm.

References

External links
 Images
 Bug Guide
 Moths of Brackenridge Field Laboratory, Texas
 California moth species list

Heliocheilus
Moths of North America